There have been two baronetcies created for members of the Hardy family, both in the Baronetage of the United Kingdom. The first creation became extinct on the death of the first baronet in 1839 and the second creation became extinct on the death of the fifth baronet in 2017.

The Hardy Baronetcy, of the Navy, was created in the Baronetage of the United Kingdom on 4 February 1806 for the prominent naval commander Vice Admiral Thomas Hardy. The title became extinct on his death in 1839.

The Hardy Baronetcy, of Dunstall Hall in the County of Stafford, was created in the Baronetage of the United Kingdom on 23 February 1876 for the Conservative politician John Hardy, who had previously represented Midhurst, Dartmouth and Warwickshire South in the House of Commons. He was the son of John Hardy and the elder brother of the Conservative politician Gathorne Gathorne-Hardy, 1st Earl of Cranbrook. The second Baronet was High Sheriff of Staffordshire in 1893.

The title became extinct on the death without a male heir of Sir Richard Hardy, 5th Baronet in 2017.

Hardy baronets, of the Navy (1806)

Sir Thomas Masterman Hardy, 1st Baronet (1769–1839)

Hardy baronets, of Dunstall Hall (1876)

Sir John Hardy, 1st Baronet (1809–1888)
Sir Reginald Hardy, 2nd Baronet (1848–1938)
Sir Bertram Hardy, 3rd Baronet (1877–1953)
Sir Rupert John Hardy, 4th Baronet (1902–1997)
Sir Richard Charles Chandos Hardy, 5th Baronet (1945–2017)

See also
Earl of Cranbrook

Notes

References
Kidd, Charles, Williamson, David (editors). Debrett's Peerage and Baronetage (1990 edition). New York: St Martin's Press, 1990, 

Extinct baronetcies in the Baronetage of the United Kingdom